When We Were Young is a 2018 Chinese streaming television series starring Hou Minghao, Wan Peng and Zhang Yao. Based on the novel of the same name, it tells a nostalgic story that revolves around high school students during the year 1996. It premiered on Tencent Video, Mango TV and WeTV on November 22, 2018 until December 8, 2018.

Cast

Main
Hou Minghao as Hua Biao
Wan Peng as Yang Xi
Li Yazhen as child Yang Xi
Zhang Yao as Li Yu
Wei Renhao as child Li Yu
Pan Meiye as Yangxiao Hemei
Li Mingde as Situ Er Tiao

Supporting
Dai Luwa as Huang Deng Deng
Chen Xijun as Yang Chao, Yangxi's brother
Wang Sen as Kong Xiaojun
Wu Yanshu as Shi Junfang, Hua Biao's grandmother
Tian Miao as Du Yuemei, Yangxi's mother
Wei Yibo as Yang Weiguo, Yangxi's father
Sun Shuaihang as Director of Li Gun'er
Wei Zixin as Li Yu's father
Wang Xiuzhu as Xiao Hongbai
Guo Zhongyou as Situ Dong Feng
Su Xin as He Mei's mother
Chen Huijuan as Situ Er Tiao's mother
Yu Xinhe as Xiao Lan
Sun Letian as Pang Tuotuo
Ning Xiaohua as Wang Laowu

Others
Feng Bo as Li Yu's mother
Du Heqian as Huang Dengdeng's mother
Zhao Ziqi as Yang Ming
Man Jianwu (满建武) as Xiao Lan's younger brother
Wang Siqin (王思钦) as Aunt Huang
Tian Shuang as Yang Ming's aunt
Song Jingao (宋景奥) as Hua Biao's father
Long Xinyue as Hua Biao's mother
Yao Bing as He Mei's father
Liu Yingjie (刘英杰) as Gao Zhihang
Zhang Chenlu (张晨璐) as Liu Beisi
Zhao Bowen (肇博文) as Bai Yunpeng
Xiao Wei as Biology Teacher
Chen Yijun (陈怡君) as Liu Dan
Yao Yiqi as Bicycle thief

Soundtrack

References

External links

Chinese web series
2020s Chinese television series debuts
2018 Chinese television series debuts
2018 Chinese television series endings
Television shows based on Chinese novels
Chinese novels adapted into television series
Television series by Tencent Penguin Pictures
Mango TV original programming